The Auster J/5 Adventurer is a British-built three-seat light high-wing monoplane of the late 1940s.

Development

The Adventurer three-seat high-wing monoplane was developed from the J/1 Autocrat with extra power provided by the installation of the 130 h.p. Gipsy Major engine, to enable more flexible operations in the hotter climate of Australia and New Zealand, where most examples were sold. Unlike the similarly powered J/1 Aiglet and J/1N Alpha, the Adventurer retained the smaller tail surfaces of the Autocrat, the new engine being set back sufficiently far for the original fin area to remain sufficient.

The prototype Adventurer was converted to the new standard from a J/1 Autocrat c/n 2093 and first flew on 15 November 1947. This was followed by a further 58 production examples delivered between 1948 and 1952.

Operational history

Most J/5s were sold to private pilot owners in Australia and New Zealand where they were given the name Adventurer. Eleven Adventurers were still in service in Australia in 2009 and one in New Zealand (see image). Six Adventurers were sold to the Royal New Zealand Air Force (RNZAF) and four to the Royal Rhodesian Air Force (RRAF). Five examples were completed for agricultural use as the J/5A Cropduster and served in Africa and Pakistan.

Variants

 J/5  civil version, also operated by the RNZAF and RRAF (54 aircraft)
 J/5A  agricultural version with spray bars, spray tank etc. (5 aircraft)

Operators

Royal New Zealand Air Force operated six J/5 Aiglets.

Southern Rhodesian Air Force operated four.

Specifications (J/5)

References

Notes

Bibliography

Auster aircraft
1940s British civil utility aircraft
Single-engined tractor aircraft
High-wing aircraft
Aircraft first flown in 1947